The Norwegian Biathlon Championships is the national biathlon championships of Norway and have been held every year since 1959.

Men

Individual (20 km)
This event was first held in 1959. It was not held in 2016.

Sprint (10 km)
This event was first held in 1974.

Pursuit (12.5 km)
This event was first held in 1997. It was not held in 2006, 2010 and 2012.

Mass start (15 km)
This event was first held in 2000. It was not held in 2007, 2008, 2009, 2011 and 2013.

Relay (4 × 7.5 km)
This event was first held in 1966.

Team
This event was first held in 1990 and was abolished as an event in 1998, as it was at the World Championships and World Cup.

Women

Individual (15 km)
This event was first held in 1979. It was not held in 2016.

Sprint (7.5 km)
This event was first held in 1979.

Pursuit (10 km)
This event was first held in 1997. It was not held in 2006, 2010 and 2012.

Mass start (12.5 km)
This event was first held in 2000. It was not held in 2007, 2008, 2009, 2011 and 2013.

Relay (3 × 6 km)
This event was first held in 1979. Through 1988, the event was 3 × 5 km. 1989-2002: 3 × 7.5 km. 2003-: 3 × 6 km.

Team
This event was first held in 1990 and was abolished as an event in 1998, as it was at the World Championships and World Cup.

Multiple individual champions
Below is a list of the top ten male and female biathletes at the Norwegian Biathlon Championships by individual gold medals. Biathletes whose names are in bold are still active.Updated: 3 April 2016

See also
 Biathlon World Championships

Notes
1.  The Norwegian Biathlon Association and Hans Lysaker sources disagree here, should possibly be Ola Lunde rather than Odd Lunde. However, Aftenposten agrees with Hans Lysaker and so that source has been given precedent.

References

External links
 Results at the Norwegian Biathlon Association
 Results at HansLysaker.net

 
Biathlon competitions in Norway
Norway
Biathlon
Recurring sporting events established in 1959
1959 establishments in Norway